Lortet’s barbel (Barbus lorteti) is a species of ray-finned fish in the  family Cyprinidae.
It is only found in the lower course of Orontes River in Syria and Turkey.
, the main lower cases of the river were poisoned and nearly dried in 1989 and changed the lake from being abundant to completely fishless. Aside from being extinct in Lake Amik, nothing else is known about the fish.

Although the patronym is not identified, probably in honor of Louis Charles Émile Lortet (1836-1909).

References

L
Taxa named by Henri Émile Sauvage
Fish described in 1882
Taxonomy articles created by Polbot
Taxobox binomials not recognized by IUCN